Lipník is a village and municipality in Prievidza District in the Trenčín Region of western Slovakia.

History
In historical records, the village was first mentioned in 1432.

Geography
The municipality lies at an altitude of 330 metres and covers an area of 5.487 km². It has a population of about 477 people.

References

External links
 
 
https://web.archive.org/web/20080111223415/http://www.statistics.sk/mosmis/eng/run.html

Villages and municipalities in Prievidza District